Obergünzburg (Swabian: Obergenzburg) is a municipality  in the district of Ostallgäu in Bavaria in Germany.

References

Ostallgäu